Cut Worms is the music project of American singer, songwriter, and musician Max Clarke.

History 
Max Clarke, known by his stage name Cut Worms, is a singer, songwriter, and musician hailing from Ohio who is currently based in Brooklyn, New York. Cut Worms has opened for bands such as Jenny Lewis, Kevin Morby, The Lemon Twigs and Michael Rault. Cut Worms released the EP Alien Sunset in 2017. 

In 2018, Cut Worms released the debut full-length album Hollow Ground on Jagjaguwar. Hollow Ground received a rating of 7.2 on Pitchfork.

Discography 
Albums

Hollow Ground – 2018, Jagjaguwar
Nobody Lives Here Anymore – 2020, Jagjaguwar

Singles and EPs

At Home – 2015, Dumpster Tapes
Don't Want to Say Good-Bye – 2016, Randy Records 
Alien Sunset – 2017, Jagjaguwar
Castle in the Clouds – 2020, Jagjaguwar

References

External links 

 Official website
 Jagjaguwar webpage

2015 establishments in New York City
Jagjaguwar artists
Musical groups established in 2015
Musical groups from New York City
People from Brooklyn